The 1994 UC Davis football team represented the University of California, Davis as an independent during the 1994 NCAA Division II football season. Led by second-year head coach Bob Biggs, UC Davis compiled a record 6–4. 1994 was the 25th consecutive winning season for the Aggies. The team their opponents 280 to 214 for the season. The Aggies played home games at Toomey Field in Davis, California.

Schedule

References

UC Davis
UC Davis Aggies football seasons
UC Davis Aggies football